Ultramar plc was a leading British oil and gas exploration and production business. It was listed on the London Stock Exchange and was a constituent of the FTSE 100 Index.

History
The Company was founded by four South African goldmining concerns in 1935 to explore for oil in Venezuela and initially traded as the Ultramar Exploration Co. Ltd. It changed its name to the Ultramar Co. Ltd in 1940.

It established an operation in Canada, now known as Ultramar Corporation, in 1961.

In 1988 it substantially expanded its operations in California acquiring a large refinery in Los Angeles from Union Pacific Corporation for $440m.

The Company was acquired by LASMO in 1991.

References

Further reading
 Atterbury, Paul and MacKenzie, Julia A Golden Adventure: the First 50 Years of Ultramar, London, Hurtwood Press, 1985 

Energy companies established in 1935
Companies formerly listed on the London Stock Exchange
Defunct companies based in London
Defunct oil companies
Defunct oil and gas companies of the United Kingdom
Non-renewable resource companies established in 1935
1935 establishments in England
1991 disestablishments in England
Companies disestablished in 1991